Zehneria capillacea is a herbaceous climbing herb of the Cucurbitaceae family native to many countries in West and Central Africa.

Description
The leaf outline is triangular with a hastate base and a deep green color. The fruit shape is elliptical and color is usually green or dark green.

Uses
Leaf extracts from the herb are used as ingredients to prepare certain vegetable soups in the Niger Delta region of Nigeria.

References

Flora of West Tropical Africa
capillacea